Antonio Caracciolo (29 January 1917 – 7 March 2017) was an Italian professional footballer who played as a forward.

Honours
Ambrosiana-Inter
 Serie A champion: 1939–40.

References

1917 births
2017 deaths
Italian footballers
Serie A players
Alma Juventus Fano 1906 players
Inter Milan players
F.C. Pro Vercelli 1892 players
A.C. Cesena players
Cosenza Calcio 1914 players
Association football forwards
A.S.D. Fanfulla players